Katherine Ella Mounce Weimer (April 15, 1919 – April 23, 2000) was a research physicist at the Princeton Plasma Physics Laboratory at the Princeton University. She is known for her scientific research in the field of plasma magnetohydrodynamic equilibrium and contribution to stability theory of a magnetically confined plasma.

Education 
Originally from New Jersey, Weimer received a scholarship to Purdue University and got her B.Sc. in chemistry in 1939. Then she continued her education at Ohio State University, switching her area of interest from chemistry to physics, and received her Ph.D. in physics in 1943. Her thesis was entitled "Artificial Radioactivity of Barium and Lanthanum" and supervised by Marion Llewellyn Pool.

Katherine Weimer was the first woman Ph.D in physics at the Ohio State University.

Scientific career 
In 1957, Weimer joined the theory group at Princeton Plasma Physics Laboratory. She was the first female research staff member at the laboratory and successfully developed her scientific career for 29 years at PPPL. She conducted fundamental research in the field of plasma equilibrium and magnetohydrodynamic stability in the toroidal magnetic confinement devices, like tokamaks and stellarators. Her work resulted in many important designs of experiments through PPPL, including devices such as the Adiabatic Toroidal Compressor (ATC), Model C Stellarator, and the Poloidal Divertor Experiment (PDX). In 1984, she retired from Princeton University after 29 years at PPPL.

Scientific legacy 
In 2001 the American Physical Society Division of Plasma Physics established the Katherine E. Weimer award to "recognize and encourage outstanding achievement in plasma science research by a woman physicist in the early years of her career." This is because the Division of Plasma Physics has historically had lower women representation compared to other divisions (7% vs 11% in 2010).

References 

1919 births
2000 deaths
American women scientists
American women physicists
Plasma physicists
Scientists from New Jersey
Ohio State University Graduate School alumni
Purdue University alumni
20th-century American women
20th-century American people